Cristian Gonzalo Oviedo Molina (born 22 May 1980) was a Chilean footballer.

He was champion of the Torneo de Apertura de Chile 2008 with Everton de Viña del Mar, after of the 3-0 Everton's victory over Colo-Colo at Estadio Sausalito.

Club career
Oviedo started his career at Club Deportivo Huachipato in 2003. Two years later he joined Deportes Naval of the Tercera División. In 2006, he joined Lota Schwager for play in the Primera B in 2006. The team qualified to the promotion playoffs against Rangers de Talca, and the team defeated the Rangers, and was promoted to the Primera División Chilena. He scored 5 goals in 34 matches that year. However, the club was relegated to Primera B and Oviedo was released from Lota Schwager.

On 25 January 2008, it was announced that Oviedo was transferred to Everton. He scored his first goal for the club in a 4–1 victory against Audax Italiano on 14 May 2008. Shortly after, Oviedo went on to win the Torneo de Apertura title with his first season with Everton. During the Torneo de Clausura of the same year, Oviedo played in most every match, although he did not score any goals and received one red card.

On 25 February 2009, Oviedo played his first international match with Everton, against the Venezuelan club Caracas FC, in a 1–0 Everton home victory. Oviedo then played with Everton in all Copa Libertadores 2009 matches. In the Torneo de Apertura, the club was eliminated in the playoff semifinals against Universidad de Chile.

During the Primera División Chilena 2010, Oviedo had a bad campaign with a record of 4 red cards and 5 yellow cards; Everton was relegated to the Primera B of 2011. In December 2010, Everton released Oviedo.

On 3 January 2011, it was announced that Oviedo had signed for O'Higgins on a free transfer on a one-year deal.

Honours

Club
Lota Schwager
Primera B Promotion Playoffs (1): 2006

Everton
Primera División de Chile (1): 2008 Apertura

References

External links
 BDFA profile

1980 births
Living people
Chilean footballers
Everton de Viña del Mar footballers
Naval de Talcahuano footballers
San Antonio Unido footballers
Santiago Morning footballers
Audax Italiano footballers
Lota Schwager footballers
C.D. Huachipato footballers
Cobreloa footballers
Association football central defenders
People from Talcahuano